Triplophysa tianeensis is a species of ray-finned fish in the genus Triplophysa.

Footnotes 
 

T
Fish described in 2004